Geneva Lake (Potawatomi: Kishwauketoe 'Clear Water') is a body of freshwater in Walworth County in the southeastern portion of the U.S. state of Wisconsin. On its shores are the city of Lake Geneva, and the villages of  Fontana-on-Geneva-Lake, and Williams Bay. The lake is known as the only place in the world where mail jumping is practiced, an unusual mail delivery system maintained as a local tradition. Geologists believe that it is a filled-in kettle formed from a receding glacier.

Lakeshore
The lake was home to a band of Prairie Potawatomi prior to the lake's settlement by colonial settlers. During the first three decades of the 19th century, the band was led by Big Foot.

The original colonial settlers on Geneva Lake referred to it as Big Foot Lake.

In the 1830s, a government surveyor named John Brink renamed the lake and the town on it for Geneva, New York, a town located on Seneca Lake, which he thought they resembled. To avoid confusion with the nearby town of Geneva, Illinois, the city was renamed Lake Geneva; later the lake was renamed Geneva Lake.

Lakeshore attractions include Big Foot Beach State Park, Lake Geneva Yacht Club, the George Williams College campus of Aurora University, and Yerkes Observatory. The observatory is no longer owned by the University of Chicago, which transferred ownership of it to the non-profit Yerkes Future Foundation (YFF) in May 2020.

Public access to the lake is allowed as the result of a decision by early European settlers that "20 feet [6 meters] of land leading up to the shoreline should be public domain".

A shorepath, which is open to the public, completely surrounds the lake. The path crosses the estates of the Schwinns, Swifts, Wackers, and Wrigleys.

References

External links

Geneva Lake West Chamber of Commerce
 , report by USGS with history and environmental info.
My Rambles in The Enchanted Summer Land, 1881

Lakes of Walworth County, Wisconsin
Kettle lakes in the United States